1987 Hong Kong–Shanghai Cup was the 22nd staging of the Hong Kong-Shanghai Cup and the first staging after the competition was halted for about 40 years. Shanghai captured the championship by winning 4–1.

Squads
The following are part of the squads for both teams.

Hong Kong
Chan Hing Wing
Pang Kam Chuen
Chan Kwok Fai
Leung Sui Wing
Tam Ah Fook
Lee Kin Wo
Tang Kam Tim
Kum Kam Fai
Lai Wing Cheong
Tim Bredbury
Chan Fat Chi

Shanghai
Zhang Weikang
Zheng Yan
Li Longha
Qin Guoyong
Zhu Youhong

Result

References

Hong Kong–Shanghai Cup
Hong
Shan